is an archaic kana orthography system used to write Japanese during the Nara period. Its primary feature is to distinguish between two groups of syllables that later merged.

The existence and meaning of this system is a critical point of scholarly debate in the study of the history of the Japanese language.

Syllables 

The following are the syllabic distinctions made in Old Japanese.

Those syllables marked in gray are known as jōdai tokushu kanazukai.

Transcription 

The two groups merged by the 9th century. It predates the development of kana, and the phonetic difference is unclear. Therefore, an ad hoc transcription system is employed.

Syllables written with subscript 1 are known as type  and those with subscript 2 as type  (these are the first two celestial stems, and are used for such numbering in Japanese).

There are several competing transcription systems. One popular system places a diaeresis above the vowel: ï, ë, ö. This typically represents i2, e2, and o2, and assumes that unmarked i, e, and o are i1, e1, and o1. It does not necessarily have anything to do with pronunciation. There are several problems with this system.
 It implies a particular pronunciation, indirectly on the vowel.
 It neglects to distinguish between words where the distinction is not clear, such as the /to/ in /toru/ as well as in /kaditori/.
It implies the unmarked Type A form is the pronunciation of syllables which do not distinguish Type A vs Type B, such as si or po. (These non-distinguishing syllables are sometimes known as Type C (丙 hei), to keep them separate from both Type A and Type B.)

Another system uses superscripts instead of subscripts.

The "Yale System" writes the type A vowels i1, e1, o1 as yi, ye, wo, and writes i2, e2, o2 as iy, ey, o̠. When vowels lack the Type A vs. Type B distinction they are given unmodified spellings (i e o). Consequently, the type C syllables are distinguishable from both A and B type without any presumption of which, if any, of the other types they shared pronunciations with. These spellings are despite their appearance not intended as reconstructions, but as abstract notations that represent Old Japanese spelling without any commitment to the pronunciation.

Meaning 

There are many hypotheses to explain the distinction. However, it is not clear whether the distinction applied to the consonant, vowel, or something else. There is no general academic agreement.

Usage 

A word is consistently, without exception, written with syllables from a specific group. For example, /kami1/ "above" and /kami2/ "god". While both words consist of an /m/ and an /i/, mi1 cannot substitute for mi2 or vice versa. This strict distinction exists for all of the syllables marked in gray.

This usage is also found in the verb morphology. The quadrigrade conjugation is as follows:

The verb /sak-/ "bloom" has quadrigrade conjugation class. Thus, its conjugation is as follows:

Before the jōdai tokushu kanazukai discovery, it was thought that quadrigrade realis and imperative shared the same form: -e. However, after the discovery, it became clear that realis was -e2 while imperative was -e1.

Also, jōdai tokushu kanazukai has a profound effect on etymology. It was once thought that /kami/ "above" and /kami/ "god" shared the same etymology, a god being an entity high above. However, after the discovery, it is known that "above" is /kami1/ while "god" is /kami2/. Thus, they are distinct words.

Man'yōgana chart 

The following chart lists syllable and man'yōgana correspondences.

Development 

The distinction between /mo1/ and /mo2/ is only made in the oldest text: Kojiki. After that, they merged into /mo/.

In later texts, confusion between types A and B can be seen. Nearly all of the A/B distinctions had vanished by the Classical Japanese period. As seen in early Heian Period texts such as Kogo Shūi, the final syllables to be distinguished were /ko1, go1/ and /ko2, go2/. After the merger, CV1 and CV2 became CV.

See also 
 Kogo Shūi, an 807 text that maintains several historical phonetic distinctions
 Tōdaiji Fujumonkō, a c. 9th-century text that maintains the /ko1, ko2/ distinction

Bibliography 
 
 

Nara period
Japanese writing system
Kanji
Kana
Archaic Japanese language

Japanese orthography